Cassidy Turbin is an American 5-time Grammy Award-winning record producer, engineer and musician based in Los Angeles, California. He has worked extensively with numerous singers, songwriters and multi-instrumentalists.

Turbin has worked with various artists, such as Beck, Childish Gambino, Charlotte Gainsbourg, Bat for Lashes, Keyon Harrold, MC Lyte, Michelle Branch, Jon Brion, Dwight Yoakam, Cadence Kid, The Chemical Brothers and Thurston Moore.

References 

Grammy Award winners
Year of birth missing (living people)
Living people